Francis Nicolls (or Nichols) may refer to:

 Francis Nicolls (MP for Bishop's Castle, Shropshire) (c.1582–1624), father of Richard Nicolls
 Sir Francis Nicolls, 1st Baronet (1586–1642), MP for Northamptonshire

See also
 Francis Nicholls (disambiguation)
 Francis Nicholson (disambiguation)
 Frank Nicholls (1699–1778), English physician